Parnes may refer to:

 People
 Anthony Parnes, English businessman
 Joseph Parnes, American money manager
 Larry Parnes, English music manager
 Laura Parnes, American video artist
 Sid Parnes, American professor

 Places
 Parnes, Oise, France
 Parnitha, a mountain range in Greece

See also
 
Parnas (disambiguation)